Dreher Island State Park is in central South Carolina roughly 30 miles (48 km) from the state's capital of Columbia.  It occupies all of the largest island in  Lake Murray, a reservoir of the Saluda River.

The park offers boating, hiking, camping, fishing for largemouth bass and other fish, picnic areas and spaces for large group meetings.  The park also contains several lodging options, including villas and cabins

It was first leased from SCE&G (now SCANA) in 1970, who built the Dreher Shoals Dam, creating Lake Murray.  Today it is a largely heavily wooded island with the only access being a bridge on its Northern side.

The park is named after the former owner of island, Billy Dreher.

See also
 List of South Carolina state parks

References

External links
Official website

State parks of South Carolina
Protected areas of Newberry County, South Carolina
Islands of South Carolina
Landforms of Newberry County, South Carolina